Mount Ibu is a stratovolcano at the north-west coast of Halmahera island, Indonesia. The summit is truncated and contains nested craters. A large parasitic cone is at the north-east of the summit and a smaller one at the south-west. The latter feeds a lava flow down the west flank. A group of maars are on the western and northern side of the volcano.

Latest activity
In August 2009 Volcanological Survey of Indonesia raised the eruption alert level for Ibu to "Orange".

See also 

 List of volcanoes in Indonesia
 Volcanological Survey of Indonesia

References

External links
Youtube video of eruption, uploaded Jan 6, 2016

Stratovolcanoes of Indonesia
Active volcanoes of Indonesia
Mountains of Indonesia
Volcanoes of Halmahera
Maars of Indonesia
Volcanic crater lakes
Holocene stratovolcanoes